Caleb Zady Sery (born 10 February 1999) is an Ivorian professional footballer who plays as a attacking midfielder for Ligue 2 club Caen.

Club career

Ajaccio 
Zady Sery made his professional debut for Ajaccio in a 0–0 league draw against Paris FC on 14 September 2018.

Caen 
On 31 August 2019, Zady Sery signed for Caen on a five-year contract.

References

External links
 
 

1999 births
Living people
People from Gagnoa
Association football forwards
Ivorian footballers
AC Ajaccio players
Stade Malherbe Caen players
Ligue 2 players
Ivorian expatriate footballers
Ivorian expatriate sportspeople in France
Expatriate footballers in France